The Chiefs Esports Club, often shortened to The Chiefs, is a professional esports club with teams competing in League of Legends, Valorant, and Halo Infinite. It is based in Australia and is one of the most well known esports clubs in Oceania. The Chiefs' League of Legends team competes in the LCO, Oceania's top-level league for the game.

League of Legends

History 

In August 2014, the roster of Team Immunity left their organisation and formed Exodus Gaming, later rebranded as the Chiefs Esports Club. Their initial roster consisted of top laner Brandon "Swip3rR" Holland, jungler Samuel "Spookz" Broadley, mid laner Simon "Swiffer" Papamarkos, bot laner Derek "Raydere" Trang, and support Andrew "Rosey" Rose, and that five-man lineup became the longest-standing active roster without any substitutions or changes in history, unbroken for 608 days. In May 2015, that streak was broken when Rosey left the team to join Sin Gaming and was replaced by EGym. Despite their roster change, the Chiefs' lineup remained at the top of their region for the duration of the 2015 season, with OPL victories all four periods of the OPL; i.e. Split 1, Split 1 playoffs, Split 2, and Split 2 playoffs. Internationally, they fared less well, placing fifth at the International Wildcard Invitational in April and second at the International Wildcard Qualifier for Worlds 2015.

In 2016, the Chiefs placed second for the first time domestically in the first OPL split, but still upset first place Legacy Esports in the playoffs, to return to the IWCI once again. They then qualified for IEM Challenger for IEM Season 11 - Oakland—their first competition against teams from major regions—but lost 0–2 against Longzhu Gaming despite standout performances from Swiffer on Orianna.

The Chiefs placed third in the OPL 2017 Split 1 regular season and fourth in playoffs after losing 2–3 to Sin Gaming in the second round. In the OPL 2017 Split 2 regular season, the Chiefs once again placed third in the regular season, but managed to advance all the way to the finals in playoffs, where they lost 1–3 to the Dire Wolves.

For all four iterations of the 2018 OPL season (i.e. Split 1 and 2 regular seasons and playoffs), the Chiefs placed second, losing to Dire Wolves in both finals. The Chiefs placed second again in the OPL 2019 Split 1 regular season, but lost 3–0 to ORDER in the third round of playoffs and failed to make it to the finals. The 2019 OPL split 2 saw the Chiefs come first in the regular season, and coming second in playoffs, losing to Mammoth in the finals of the split 3–0.

The Chiefs came second in the regular season of the 2020 OPL Split 1, and lost 2–3 to Dire Wolves in the playoffs, finishing third overall. After finishing fourth in the regular season of the 2020 OPL Split 2, the team went on to finish third once again in playoffs, losing to ORDER 1–3.

The Chiefs were selected as one of the eight teams of the LCO following the dissolution of the OPL. Much of the team's 2020 roster left during the 2021 preseason, with only support Dragku remaining.

Current roster

Counter-Strike: Global Offensive 

The Chiefs Esports Club first entered the professional CS:GO scene with its acquisition of the Qlimax Crew in 2015.

The Chiefs disbanded its CS:GO division in late 2021.

References

External links 
 

2014 establishments in Australia
Esports teams established in 2014
Esports teams based in Australia
Counter-Strike teams
Former Oceanic Pro League teams
League of Legends Circuit Oceania teams